The Northern Ontario Hockey Association (NOHA) is an ice hockey governing body for minor, junior and senior ice hockey.  The NOHA is sanctioned by the Ontario Hockey Federation and Hockey Canada.  The major league run by the NOHA is the Northern Ontario Junior Hockey League of the Canadian Junior A Hockey League.

History
The NOHA was founded in 1919 and that same year became affiliated with the Ontario Hockey Association (OHA).  In May 1963, the NOHA applied to the Canadian Amateur Hockey Association to become an equal branch to the OHA. When the request was denied, OHA president Lloyd Pollock stated that measures needed to be put in place to prevent the migration of players southwards to the more populated OHA, and preserve the leagues in Northern Ontario.

During the summer in 1989, the Metro Toronto Hockey League, Ontario Minor Hockey Association (OMHA), OHA and NOHA, joined under the umbrella of the Ontario Hockey Federation (OHF). Each organization was given equal representation on its board of governors, which was given the mandate to oversee hockey in Ontario, and be a review panel for three years to propose further restructuring if necessary.

The senior A-level champions of the NOHA and the OHA formerly competed in a playoffs series for the W. A. Hewitt Trophy.

Former leagues
International Junior B Hockey League
North of Superior Junior B Hockey League
Northern Ontario Junior Hockey Association

Jurisdiction
Empowered by Hockey Canada, the Northern Ontario Hockey Association governs all Ontario senior and junior hockey not administered by Hockey Northwestern Ontario, Ottawa District Hockey Association, or Ontario Hockey Association.  This does not include the Greater Metro Junior A Hockey League, which is privately run outside of Hockey Canada and are not affiliated.

The Ottawa District governs the part of Ontario East of and including Lanark County, Renfrew County, and Leeds County, but not including the town of Gananoque.  Hockey Northwestern Ontario has control of the section of Northwestern Ontario west of the 85th meridian.

References

External links
NOHA website

Ice hockey governing bodies in Ontario
Sport in Northern Ontario
Sports organizations established in 1919